The Soalala mine is a large iron mine located in northern Madagascar in Boeny in Soalala. It represents one of the largest iron ore reserves in Madagascar and in the world having estimated reserves of 360 million tonnes of ore grading 35% iron metal.

See also 
Mining industry of Madagascar

References 

Iron mines in Madagascar